Catherine Demongeot (born 16 May 1950, in Paris) is a French former child actress. Her debut role was Zazie in Zazie in the Metro (1960); this was followed by only a few more films. According to an interview with Vincent Malle (film producer, and brother of Louis Malle) for the UK DVD release of Zazie (2006, Optimum Releasing), Demongeot never made another film and later went on to become a teacher.

Although Vladimir Nabokov originally thought that Sue Lyon was the right selection to play Lolita in Stanley Kubrick's film of that name, years later Nabokov said that the ideal Lolita would have been Demongeot.

Selected filmography
 Zazie in the Metro (1960)
 Faites sauter la banque! (1964)
 Mise à sac (1967)

References

External links 
 
 About Zazie

1950 births
Living people
Actresses from Paris
20th-century French actresses
French child actresses
French film actresses